The Roman Catholic Diocese of Joinville is a suffragan Latin diocese in the Ecclesiastical province of the Metropolitan of Florianópolis in Santa Catarina state, southern Brazil.

Its cathedral episcopal ses is Catedral São Francisco Xavier, dedicated to saint Francis Xavier, in the city of Joinville.

History 
 Established on 17 January 1927 as Diocese of Joinville, on territory split off from the Diocese of Santa Caterina.
 Lost territories repeatedly : on 1968.11.23 to establish the Diocese of Rio do Sul and on 2000.04.19 to establish the Diocese of Blumenau

Statistics 
As per 2014, it pastorally served 744,219 Catholics (65.0% of 1,144,952 total)  on 9,508 km² in 53 parishes and 5 missions with 118 priests (64 diocesan, 54 religious), 55 deacons, 228 lay religious (104 brothers, 124 sisters) and 26 seminarians.

Bishops
(Latin Church)

Episcopal ordinaries
Suffragan Bishops of Joinville 
 Pio de Freitas Silveira, Congregation of the Mission (C.M., Lazarists) (1929.01.25 – retired 1955.01.19), emeritate as Titular Bishop of Voncaria (1955.01.19 – death 1963.05.19)
''Apostolic Administrator Inácio Krause (葛樂才), C.M. (1956 – 1957.04.03), while Auxiliary Bishop of Archdiocese of Curitiba (Brazil) (1950 – retired 1963), died 1984; previously only Apostolic Prefect of Shundefu 順德府 (China) (1933.10.26 – 1944.01.13), Titular Bishop of Binda (1944.01.13 – 1946.04.11) as only Apostolic Vicar of Shundefu 順德府 (China) (1944.01.13 – 1946.04.11), promoted first Suffragan Bishop of Shunde 順德 (China) (1946.04.11 – 1950)
 Gregório Warmeling (1957.04.03 – retired 1994.03.09), died 1997
 Orlando Brandes (1994.03.09 – 2006.05.10), next Metropolitan Archbishop of Londrina (Brazil) (2006.05.10 – 2016.11.16), Metropolitan Archbishop of Aparecida (Brazil) (2016.11.16 – ...)
 Irineu Roque Scherer (2007.05.30 – death 2016.07.02), previously Bishop of Garanhuns (Brazil) (1998.04.15 – 2007.05.30)
 Francisco Carlos Bach (2017.04.19 – ...), previously Bishop of Toledo (Brazil) (2005.07.27 – 2012.10.03), Bishop of São José dos Pinhais (Brazil) (2012.10.03 – 2017.04.19) and Apostolic Administrator of Diocese of Paranaguá (Brazil) (2015.04.11 – 2015.11.25).

Coadjutor bishop
Inácio João Dal Monte, O.F.M. Cap. (1949-1952), did not succeed to see; appointed Bishop of Guaxupé, Minas Gerais

See also 
 List of Catholic dioceses in Brazil

Sources and external links 
 GCatholic.org, with Google map & satellite photo - data for all sections
 Diocese website (Portuguese)
 Catholic Hierarchy

Roman Catholic dioceses in Brazil
Diocese
Religious organizations established in 1927
Roman Catholic Ecclesiastical Province of Florianópolis
Roman Catholic dioceses and prelatures established in the 20th century